Kemberg was a Verwaltungsgemeinschaft ("administrative community") in the district of Wittenberg, in Saxony-Anhalt, Germany. The seat of the Verwaltungsgemeinschaft was Kemberg. It was disbanded on 1 January 2010.

The Verwaltungsgemeinschaft of Kemberg consisted of the following municipalities (population in 2005 in brackets):

Dabrun (686) 
Eutzsch (658) 
Kemberg * (4,784) 
Rackith (682) 
Radis (1,354) 
Rotta (892) 
Schleesen (537) 
Selbitz (410) 
Uthausen (212) 
Wartenburg (824)

References

Former Verwaltungsgemeinschaften in Saxony-Anhalt